Dead Head is a Dutch thrash metal band from the city Kampen. The band was formed in 1989 by the four original members Tom van Dijk (bass, vocals), Robbie Woning (guitar), Ronnie van der Wey (guitar), and Hans Spijker (drums). Their mission was to become the most intensive and brutal thrash metal band Europe ever had seen. They were influenced by classic thrash metal bands like Dark Angel, Kreator and Sadus.

They released their debut album in 1991, and have released seven studio albums and one 10 inch.

History

Dead Head were formed in 1989 and after releasing a number of demos, in 1990 they scored a record deal with the German company Rising Sun Records, who released Dead Head's first album, The Feast Begins at Dawn, in 1991. After the recordings for the debut album Dead Head did a tour through Denmark with Edge of Sanity and Invocator, and played in Holland with Sepultura, Heathen, Skyclad, Candlemass, Suffocation, Sinister, Gorefest, Malevolent Creation and Grave.

Their original drummer Hans Spijker was replaced by Marco Kleinnibbelink in 1992. With their new drummer Dead Head started working on new material for their second album which resulted in the album Dream Deceiver in 1993. Before the release of that album Dead Head did a European tour with the band Massacra. During the tour Dead Head played with big names like Kreator and Biohazard in Belgium.

Kill Division, Dead Head's third album was put together in the original line-up as they began in 1989. Altogether, this album represents the band's roots more than anything, maybe except from playing live. The songs were recorded totally live.

It took a lot of time to write a sequel to Kill Division. However, with their fourth album, Haatland, the band did what they wanted to do: put out a straightforward aggressive thrash metal album that came from their hearts. The recording began in 2004 and the album was released in 2005 to critical acclaim.

The band began writing songs for new material in 2007 while doing only a few shows in the Netherlands. In 2008 they signed a record deal with the label Displeased Records. In April 2012 Dead Head announced the returning of the original frontman Tom van Dijk.

Band members

Current members
Ralph de Boer – bass guitar, lead vocals (2008–2011, 2021–present)
Ronnie van der Wey – guitar (1989–present)
Robbie Woning – guitar (1989–present)
Hans Spijker – drums (1989–1992, 1995–present)

Former members
Tom van Dijk – bass guitar, lead vocals (1989–1999, 2003–2008, 2012–2021)
Marco Kleinnibbelink – drums (1992–1995)
Michiel Dekker – bass guitar, lead vocals (1999–2002)
Johan Wesdijk - vocals (2003-2004)
Alex Geerts - bass (2003-2004)

Timeline

Discography
Albums
1991 – The Feast Begins at Dawn (Bad Taste Recordings)
1993 – Dream Deceiver (Bad Taste Recordings)
1999 – Kill Division (Cold Blood Industries)
2000 – Come to Salem (Unveiling the Wicked/Hammerheart)
2005 – Haatland (Extremity/GMR Music Group)
2009 – Depression Tank (Displeased Records)
2017 – Swine Plague (HammerHeart)
2022 - Slave Driver (HammerHeart)

EPs
2004 – Dog God EP (Fadeless Records)

Demos
1989 – Double Live Tape
1990 – The Festering

References

External links
Official Dead Head website

Musical groups established in 1989
Dutch thrash metal musical groups
Dutch heavy metal musical groups
Musical quartets